Enoch Ebo Andoh (born 1 January 1993) is a Ghanaian footballer who plays as a winger for  club St Ives Town.

He began his career in his native Ghana with Hearts of Oak and King Faisal Babes, before being signed up by Portuguese club FC Porto. He joined Cypriot side AEL Limassol in 2012, playing for the club in Cypriot Super Cup and Cypriot Cup final defeats before moving to England to play for Port Vale in November 2014. He broke into the first team in the 2015–16 season, but picked up a serious injury in October 2015, and chose to leave the club in July 2016. He signed with Whitehawk in September 2017 and went on to join Nuneaton Borough in August 2018. He returned to the English Football League when he signed with Macclesfield Town in January 2019. He went on to play for Hednesford Town and Wealdstone, before returning to Nuneaton Borough in January 2020. He moved on to Stratford Town in September 2020, then signed with Biggleswade Town in January 2022 and St Ives Town in August 2022.

Club career

Early career
Born in Kumasi, Andoh started his professional career with Hearts of Oak, before transferring to league rivals King Faisal Babes in 2008 where he made his first-team debut. Having impressed in the Ghana Premier League, he was soon linked with a move abroad, including Free State Stars in South Africa.

In January 2011, he was sold to Portuguese club FC Porto. He was a key member of the club's under-19 side during the 2011–12 season, scoring seven times as the team won the Northern Section of the Under-19 Portuguese Championship. In the finals stage, he scored as Porto defeated arch-rivals Benfica 3–0, while the side finished the competition fourth overall.

He signed with Cypriot First Division side AEL Limassol in 2012, and played in the Cypriot Super Cup final defeat to AC Omonia on 18 August. Head coach Jorge Costa led the club to a fifth-place finish in the 2012–13 season. Andoh was an unused substitute in the Cypriot Cup final defeat to Apollon Limassol at the Tsirion Stadium. New boss Ivaylo Petev took them to second place in the 2013–14 campaign.

Port Vale
He signed an eighteen-month contract with English League One side Port Vale on 25 November 2014, following a number of weeks training with the club. Having been overlooked for several months he enjoyed an impressive pre-season to force his way into the first team picture for the 2015–16 season.

He made his debut in the English Football League on 8 August in a 0–0 draw with rivals Crewe Alexandra at Gresty Road. He soon secured his place as the club's first-choice left-winger, and quickly became a popular player with supporters due to his positive attacking play. Club chairman Norman Smurthwaite stated that he expected to sell Andoh for around £2.5 million in the January transfer window, and the Sunday People reported that Tottenham Hotspur were tracking the player. He scored his first goal for the club in a 1–1 draw with Peterborough United on 17 October. Three days later he suffered anterior cruciate damage in a collision with Colchester United goalkeeper Jamie Jones and was ruled out for the rest of the season. He left the club in July 2016 after failing to agree terms on a new contract. He returned to Vale Park to train with the youth team in December 2016. He played a reserve team game for the Vale, the first since his injury, on 8 March 2017.

Non-League
Andoh had a trial at Oldham Athletic in July 2017. On 15 September 2017, he signed for National League South club Whitehawk. He scored on his debut the following day in a 3–1 defeat to Oxford City in the second qualifying round of the FA Cup. However he left the club in December 2017.

On 2 August 2018, Andoh signed with National League North side Nuneaton Borough after scoring for "Boro" in a pre-season friendly with former club Port Vale whilst on trial at Liberty Way. He scored four goals in 12 games in a three-month stay, and also picked up one assist and one player of the match award.

Macclesfield Town
On 11 January 2019, Andoh returned to the English Football League when he signed a short-term contract with League Two side Macclesfield Town. However he did not play a first-team game for the "Silkmen" and was released by manager Sol Campbell at the end of the 2018–19 season.

Later career
On 22 September 2019, Andoh joined Hednesford Town of the Southern League Premier Division Central and won a penalty later that day in his debut for the "Pitmen" in an FA Cup game with Barwell. He also played one cup game for Wealdstone on 29 October 2019. He left the club on 21 January 2020 to rejoin Nuneaton Borough, now in the Southern League Premier Division Central. As a result of the COVID-19 pandemic in England, the 2019–20 season's competition was formally abandoned on 26 March 2020, with all results from the season being expunged, and no promotion or relegation taking place to, from, or within the competition. He switched to divisional rivals Stratford Town in September 2020. The 2020–21 season was also abandoned due to the ongoing pandemic in February 2021. He scored a hat-trick during a 5–3 defeat at Cirencester Town on 7 September 2021. He scored a total of seven goals from 24 games for the "Bards" in the first half of the 2021–22 campaign.

On 12 January 2022, Andoh signed with Biggleswade Town, also of the Southern League Premier Division Central. He made 18 appearances in the second half of the 2021–22 season, scoring one goal in the Bedfordshire Senior Cup, as the "Waders" were relegated into Division One Central. In August 2022, Andoh returned to the division when he joined St Ives Town.

International career
Andoh was named in the Ghana under-20 squad at the 2011 African Nations Championship in Sudan by head coach Orlando Wellington. He was called up to the under-23 side in April 2015.

Style of play
Andoh is a pacey winger who is able to take on defenders.

Career statistics

Honours
AEL Limassol
Cypriot Super Cup runner-up: 2013
Cypriot Cup runner-up: 2013
Cypriot First Division runner-up: 2013–14

References

External links

1993 births
Living people
Footballers from Kumasi
Ghanaian footballers
Ghana under-20 international footballers
Ghanaian expatriate footballers
Expatriate footballers in Portugal
Expatriate footballers in Cyprus
Expatriate footballers in England
Cypriot First Division players
Association football wingers
FC Porto players
AEL Limassol players
Port Vale F.C. players
Whitehawk F.C. players
Nuneaton Borough F.C. players
Macclesfield Town F.C. players
Hednesford Town F.C. players
Wealdstone F.C. players
Stratford Town F.C. players
Biggleswade Town F.C. players
St Ives Town F.C. players
English Football League players
National League (English football) players
Southern Football League players
2011 African Nations Championship players